Luis María Atienza Serna (born 30 August 1957) is a Spanish politician and businessman. He served as Minister of Agriculture, Fisheries and Food from May 1994 to May 1996. During his time as Agriculture Minister, the National Parks Autonomous Agency (OAPN) was created.

He also served as Regional Minister for Economy and Planification of the Basque Government from 1989 to 1991.

References

1957 births
Living people
University of Deusto alumni
Government ministers of Spain
20th-century Spanish politicians